Cognitive closure may refer to:

 Cognitive closure (psychology), the human desire to eliminate ambiguity and arrive at definite conclusions (sometimes irrationally)
 Cognitive closure (philosophy), the idea that only certain things are understandable by beings like us